Intimacy is the third studio album by Bruce Roberts, released on September 19, 1995. It featured musical and vocal contributions by many notable artists.

Track listing
"Intimacy" (Bruce Roberts, Junior Miles)
"Real" (Roberts, Allee Willis)
"Let Me Steal Your Heart" (Roberts)
"When Love Goes" (Roberts, Miles)
"My One Joy" (Roberts)
"When the Money's Gone" (Roberts, Donna Weiss)
"Raise the Population" (Roberts)
"All Through the Night" (Roberts, Donna Summer)
"Emerald" (Roberts)
"The Man Who Loves You" (Roberts, Miles)

Personnel
All-4-One - backing vocals on "When Love Goes"
Nickolas Ashford and Valerie Simpson - backing vocals
Jimmy Bralower - drum programming
Steve Deutsch - keyboards and synthesizers
David Foster - keyboards and synthesizers
Simon Franglen - drum programming
Pete Gleadall - keyboards and synthesizers, drum programming
James Newton Howard - keyboards and synthesizers
James Ingram - backing vocals
Paul Jackson Jr. - guitar
Elton John - keyboards and synthesizers, backing vocals
Davey Johnstone - guitar
k.d. lang - harmony vocal on "Real"
David Lasley - backing vocals
Novi Novog - viola
Greg O'Connor - keyboards and synthesizers
Bruce Roberts - vocals, acoustic piano, keyboards and synthesizers, drum programming
Brenda Russell - backing vocals
John Schreiner - keyboards and synthesizers
Myrna Smith - backing vocals
Ramon Stagnaro - guitar
Neil Stubenhaus - bass
Michael Thompson - guitar
David Tobocman - keyboards and synthesizers, drum programming
Luther Vandross - backing vocals
Tom "T-Bone" Wolk - guitar, bass

References

1995 albums
Albums produced by David Foster
Atlantic Records albums
Bruce Roberts (singer) albums